Chapeh (also known as Cheyeh) is a village in Shoqan Rural District, Jolgeh Shoqan District, Jajrom County, North Khorasan Province, Iran. At the 2006 census, its population was 46, in 16 families.

References 

Populated places in Jajrom County